The following is the squad list for the 2017 Pacific Mini Games.

Squads

Head coach:  Christophe Gamel

Head coach: Francois Tartas

Head coach:  Felipe Vera-Arango

Head coach: Timote Moleni

Head coach: Taukiei Ituaso

Head coach: Moise Poida

References

External links
OFC U-20 Men's Championship 2014, oceaniafootball.com

Football at the 2017 Pacific Mini Games
Association football tournament squads